The Brownies is a series of publications by Canadian illustrator and author Palmer Cox, based on names and elements from English traditional mythology and Scottish stories told to Cox by his grandmother. Illustrations with verse aimed at children, The Brownies was published in magazines and books during the late 19th century and early 20th century. The Brownie characters became famous in their day, and were the first North American comic characters to be internationally merchandised.

Characters and story 
Brownies are little fairy- or goblin-like creatures who appear at night and make mischief and do helpful tasks. As published by Palmer Cox, they were based on Scottish folktales.

Publication history

The first appearances of Brownie characters in a print publication took place in 1879, but not until the February 1881 issue of Wide Awake magazine were the creatures printed in their final form. The first proper story, The Brownies' Ride, appeared in the February 1883 issue of the children's periodical St. Nicholas Magazine.

Published in 1899, The Brownies Abroad is considered the first Brownie comic strip, though it was mostly a text comic. It didn't utilise speech balloons until the publication The Brownie Clown of Brownie Town of 1908. From 1903, The Brownies appeared as a newspaper Sunday strip for several years.

The first compilation, The Brownies, Their Book, was published in 1887, followed by 16 books in the series until the last in 1918. Palmer Cox died in 1924.

Merchandising
Beyond print publication, The Brownies was at least twice adapted to stage plays. With the rise in popularity of the Brownie characters, these were used in many venues of merchandising, such as games, blocks, cards, dolls, calendars, advertisements, package labels, mugs, plates, flags, soda pop, a slot machine, a bagatelle game and so forth. George Eastman applied the brand name in promotion of Kodak's "Brownie Camera", but Palmer Cox reportedly never received any money from Kodak for the commercial use of his work.

Sources

 The Brownies list of publications

Footnotes

External links

Main books
 Cox, Palmer. The Brownies, Their Book. New York: The Century Co., 1887.
 Cox, Palmer. Another Brownie Book. New York: The Century Co., 1890.
 Cox, Palmer. The Brownies at Home. New York-London: D. Appleton-Century Company Incorporated, [1893] 1936.
 Cox, Palmer. The Brownies Around the World. New York-London: D. Appleton-Century Company Incorporated, [1894] 1937.
 Cox, Palmer. The Brownies Through the Union. New York: The Century Co., 1895.
 Cox, Palmer. The Brownies Abroad. New York: The Century Co., 1899.
 Judd, Mary C. The Palmer Cox Brownie Primer. Pictures by Palmer Cox. New York: The Century Co., [1906] 1921.
 Cox, Palmer. The Brownies Many More Nights. New York: The Century Co., 1913.
 Cox, Palmer. The Brownies and Prince Florimel. New York: The Century Co., 1918.

Other
  "The Brownies at School" from The Brownies: Their Book The Baldwin Library of Historical Children's Literature
 Palmer Cox and The Eastman Kodak Brownie camera

Fictional characters introduced in 1879
Characters in children's literature
Canadian children's books
Comic strips started in the 1890s
Fairies and sprites in popular culture
Fictional fairies and sprites
Kodak cameras
Canadian comic strips
Canadian comics characters
1890s comics
1924 comics endings
Fantasy comics
Text comics